This is a list of rural localities in Kemerovo Oblast. Kemerovo Oblast (Kemerovskaya oblast) is a federal subject of Russia (an oblast), located in southwestern Siberia, where the West Siberian Plain meets the South Siberian Mountains. Kemerovo is the administrative center of the oblast. The population recorded during the 2010 Census was 2,763,135.

Izhmorsky District 
Rural localities in Izhmorsky District:

 324 km

Leninsk-Kuznetsky District 
Rural localities in Leninsk-Kuznetsky District:

 169 km
 189 km

Mariinsky District 
Rural localities in Mariinsky District:

 10th razezd

Novokuznetsky District 
Rural localities in Novokuznetsky District:

 360 km
 75th Piket

Promyshlennovsky District 
Rural localities in Promyshlennovsky District:

 210 km
 239 km
 251 km
 Abyshevo

Tashtagolsky District 
Rural localities in Tashtagolsky District:

 517 km
 527 km
 534 km
 538 km
 545 km

Topkinsky District 
Rural localities in Topkinsky District:

 115 km
 123 km
 13 km
 130 km
 137 km
 15 km
 64 km
 79 km
 96 km

Yurginsky District, Kemerovo Oblast 
Rural localities in Yurginsky District, Kemerovo Oblast:

 23 km
 31 km
 54 km

See also 
 
 Lists of rural localities in Russia

References 

Kemerovo Oblast